This article comprises a sortable table of major mountain peaks of the Wicklow Mountains of Ireland.  This article defines a major mountain peak as a summit with a topographic elevation of at least . Topographic elevation is defined as the vertical distance above the reference geoid, a precise mathematical model of the Earth's sea level as an equipotential gravitational surface.

References

Mountains and hills of County Wicklow